The 2021 Primera B de Chile, also known as Campeonato Ascenso Betsson 2021 for sponsorship purposes, was the 67th season of the Primera B de Chile, Chile's second-tier football league. The season started on 3 April 2021.

Coquimbo Unido were the champions, winning their fourth title in the competition as well as clinching promotion to Primera División with a 2–1 victory over Fernandez Vial on 13 November, the last matchday of the regular season.

Format
The tournament was played by 16 teams, 12 returning from the previous season, three relegated from Campeonato Nacional (Coquimbo Unido, Deportes Iquique and Universidad de Concepción), and the Segunda División Profesional champions. The 16 teams play each other in a double round-robin tournament (once at home and once away) for a total of 30 matches. The top team at the end of the 30 rounds was the champion and was promoted to the Campeonato Nacional for its 2022 season, with the next four teams playing a play-off stage with its winner qualifying for a promotion/relegation play-off against the 15th-placed team of the Campeonato Nacional. On the other hand, the bottom-placed team of the table was relegated to the Segunda División Profesional.

Teams
Originally, Lautaro de Buin were to take part in the competition as 2020 Segunda División Profesional champions, but the club was suspended per ruling by ANFP's Court of Justice due to irregularities with the contracts of their players, and later expelled from the ANFP on 5 May 2021. Following an appeal by Lautaro de Buin, on 10 June 2021 the original ruling was changed to a six-point deduction in the Segunda División standings, thereby losing the first place and declaring Fernandez Vial as Segunda División champions, who in turn also took Lautaro's place in Primera B.

Stadia and locations

Standings

Results

Play-offs

Bracket

Semi-finals

Deportes Copiapó won 3–2 on aggregate and advanced to the finals.

Deportes Temuco won 3–2 on aggregate and advanced to the finals.

Finals

Deportes Copiapó won 3–2 on aggregate and qualified for the promotion/relegation play-off.

Top scorers

Source: Soccerway

Promotion/relegation play-off
The winners of the Primera B play-offs, Deportes Copiapó, played Huachipato, the team placed 15th in the 2021 Chilean Primera División, in a double-legged series. The winners earned the right to play in the top flight for the following season.

Huachipato won 4–2 on aggregate and remained in Primera División.

See also
 2021 Chilean Primera División
 2021 Copa Chile

References

External links
Primera B on ANFP's website

Primera B de Chile seasons
Primera B
Primera B
Chile